The 2013–14 Purdue Boilermakers men's basketball team represented Purdue University. The head coach is Matt Painter, in his ninth season with the Boilers. The team played its home games in Mackey Arena in West Lafayette, Indiana, U.S., and was a member of the Big Ten Conference. They finished the season 15–17, 5–13 in Big Ten play to finish in last place. They lost in the first round of the Big Ten tournament to Ohio State.

Roster

Incoming recruits

Schedule

|-
!colspan=9 style=|  Exhibition

|-
!colspan=9 style=|  Non-conference regular season

|-
!colspan=9 style=| Big Ten regular season

|-
!colspan=9 style=| Big Ten tournament

See also
2013–14 Purdue Boilermakers women's basketball team

References

Purdue Boilermakers men's basketball seasons
Purdue
Purd
Purd